Buzan may refer to:

People 
Buzan, khan of the Chagatai Khanate
Barry Buzan (born 1946), British political scientist
Tony Buzan (1942–2019), English author

Places 
Buzan, Ariège, a town in France
Buzan, Astrakhan Oblast, Russia
Buzan (river), a distributary of the Volga in Astrakhan Oblast, Russia
Buzan, Iran, a village in Razavi Khorasan Province
Buzan, Iraq, a village in Ninewa Governorate

Other uses 
Buzan-ha, a Japanese Shingon Buddhist sect

See also
Busan (disambiguation)
Buzhan (disambiguation)